Grace Randolph is an American reporter, film critic, YouTuber, and comic book writer. On YouTube, she hosts her channel Beyond the Trailer. She has written numerous comics, among them issues of Justice League Unlimited and X-Men: Nation X, as well as creating the original comic book series Supurbia.

Education 
Randolph studied at New York University's Tisch School of the Arts, and was part of the Upright Citizens Brigade comedy group.

Career

Comic books 
From 2008 to 2009, Randolph wrote for Tokyopop's manga adaptations of the Warcraft and StarCraft video game franchises.

In 2009 Randolph wrote DC Comics's Justice League Unlimited #41. She went on to write Boom! Studios' Muppet Peter Pan, which was a reinterpretation of Peter Pan as a Muppet story. In 2010 she wrote Her-oes, a comic book mini-series about the teenage years of some of Marvel Comics' most famous female Avengers. In 2011 she wrote for Archaia's Fraggle Rock comic.

In 2012 Randolph created and wrote the original comic book series Supurbia, which was published by Boom! Studios. Supurbia is a Real Housewives interpretation of the superhero genre, which  "explores the drama of superheroes' personal lives" within the context of a suburban lifestyle. It was initially intended to be a four-issue limited series, but its success led to a twelve-issue continuation.

She has also written for Marvel Comics' Her-oes and X-Men: Nation X.

YouTube and television 
In 2008 Randolph created Beyond the Trailer, a YouTube channel which discusses film and the film industry. As of January 2022, the channel has 940 thousand subscribers. In 2012 Beyond the Trailer became a part of Penske Media Corporation's digital network.

From 2010 to 2011, Randolph was the host of Marvel Comics' weekly web news show, The Watcher. She revealed that she was fired by Marvel.

In 2011, in association with Bleeding Cool, she created the YouTube channel Think About the Ink. The videos explore comic books and the comic book industry, as well as TV adaptations of comic book properties. The channel's last video was uploaded in March 2015.

From 2012 to 2013 she was associated with Movieline. In 2014 and 2015, she was an entertainment correspondent for WTNH NEWS8, appearing on Good Morning Connecticut.

In 2019 Randolph appeared in a post-credits scene in the film Zombieland: Double Tap in a cameo as an entertainment reporter alongside actor Bill Murray, who played a fictionalized version of himself.

Controversies

James Gunn 
Grace Randolph is known to have a contentious relationship with film director James Gunn. In November 2012, Randolph advocated that Marvel Studios fire Gunn for offensive comments he made in 2009, despite Gunn apologizing for his remarks. In 2017, Randolph claimed that Gunn did not give Thanos a large role in his Guardians of the Galaxy films because he did not find the character interesting; Gunn denied her claim and later stated that Randolph "likes to just make up stuff [he] said because it helps her get clicks." After Randolph claimed that the character Bane would appear in Gunn's Peacemaker series, Gunn said that the character "does not show up at the end or anywhere and has zero lines." After Randolph reported that audience reactions to Peacemaker were "less than stellar"; Gunn responded that "Grace Randolph will spout bullshit."

Birds of Prey reshoots 
In June 2020, Randolph reported that the film Birds of Prey underwent "massive reshoots" to take out an alleged dick pic storyline that contained elements of pedophilia. Director Cathy Yan vehemently denied the allegation while downplaying the severity of the reshoots, criticizing Randolph for her lack of research. Randolph defended her report, leading to an exchange between the two on Twitter with Yan questioning Randolph's credibility as a journalist.

Pedro Pascal and The Mandalorian 
In September 2020, Randolph claimed in a reaction video on Beyond the Trailer that The Mandalorian star Pedro Pascal had quit halfway through filming the second season over being denied more screen time without the titular character's helmet on. Randolph further alleged that Pascal's behavior led to Lucasfilm killing his character off and replacing him with Boba Fett (played by Temuera Morrison) for the third season. When Pascal was asked about these reports in an interview with The One Show, he categorically denied Randolph's claims, while Pascal's stunt double confirmed Pascal's involvement with the entire third season in an Instagram post. Randolph refused to retract her story, arguing that the post-credits scene from The Mandalorian second season finale, which foreshadowed The Book of Boba Fett, corroborated her claims. Jon Favreau, the showrunner of The Mandalorian, later clarified that The Book of Boba Fett was separate from the third season of The Mandalorian. Randolph's handling of the Pascal story was criticized by other journalists, who described her report as clickbait and singled out her lack of reliable sources; they also asserted that her claims of Pascal being uncooperative on set could have potentially damaged his reputation and career.

References

External links 
 
 

Living people
American comics writers
American film critics
American women film critics
American YouTubers
Commentary YouTubers
DC Comics people
Marvel Comics people
Marvel Comics writers
News YouTubers
Tisch School of the Arts alumni
YouTube channels launched in 2008
YouTube critics and reviewers
Place of birth missing (living people)
Year of birth missing (living people)